Nauck may refer to:

 Johann August Nauck (1822-1892), German classical scholar
 Todd Nauck (born 1971), American comic book writer and artist
 Nauck, Virginia, a neighborhood in Arlington, Virginia

See also

 Knock (disambiguation)
 Nock (disambiguation)